A Man for All Seasons is a 1966 British historical drama film directed and produced by Fred Zinnemann, adapted by Robert Bolt from his play of the same name. It depicts the final years of Sir Thomas More, the 16th-century Lord Chancellor of England who refused both to sign a letter asking Pope Clement VII to annul Henry VIII of England's marriage to Catherine of Aragon and to take an Oath of Supremacy declaring Henry Supreme Head of the Church of England.

Paul Scofield, who had played More in the West End stage premiere, also took the role in the film, starring alongside Wendy Hiller, Robert Shaw, Susannah York, and Orson Welles. Also appearing are Nigel Davenport, Leo McKern, Corin Redgrave, Vanessa Redgrave and, in one of his earliest screen roles, John Hurt. The film was released by Columbia Pictures on 12 December 1966.

A Man for All Seasons was a critical and box-office success. It won the Academy Award for Best Picture at the 39th Academy Awards, while the cast and crew won another five, including Best Director for Zinnemann and Best Actor for Scofield. It also won the Golden Globe Award for Best Motion Picture - Drama and the BAFTA Awards for Best Film and Best British Film. In 1999, the British Film Institute named it the 43rd greatest British film of all time.

Title
The title reflects playwright Bolt's portrayal of More as the ultimate man of conscience, remaining true to his principles and religion under all circumstances and at all times. Bolt borrowed the title from Robert Whittington, a contemporary of More, who in 1520 wrote of him:

Plot
The film covers the years 1529 to 1535, during the reign of Henry VIII.

During a private late-night meeting at Hampton Court, Cardinal Wolsey, Lord Chancellor of England, chastises More for being the only member of the privy council to oppose Wolsey's attempts to obtain from the Pope an annulment of Henry VIII's marriage to Catherine of Aragon, as their marriage has not produced a male heir. With the annulment, Henry would be able to marry Anne Boleyn, with whom he hopes to father such an heir and avoid a repeat of the Wars of the Roses. More says that he cannot agree to Wolsey's suggestion that they apply "pressure" on Church property and revenue in England. Unknown to More, the conversation is being overheard by Wolsey's aide, Thomas Cromwell.

Returning to his home at Chelsea at dawn, More finds his young acquaintance Richard Rich waiting for his return so as to lobby for a position at Court. More instead offers Rich a job as a teacher. Rich declines More's offer, saying that teaching would offer him little chance to become well known. More finds his daughter Meg chatting with a brilliant young lawyer, William Roper, who announces his desire to marry her. The devoutly Catholic More says he cannot give his blessing as long as Roper remains a Lutheran.

Some time later, Wolsey dies in a rural monastery in disgrace after banishment from court for failing to obtain the papal annulment Henry wanted. Henry appoints More Lord Chancellor of England. The King makes an "impromptu" visit to the More estate and again requests More's support for an annulment, but More remains unmoved as Henry alternates between threats, tantrums, and promises of unbounded royal favour. As the King leaves, Cromwell promises Rich a position at Court in return for damaging information about More.

Roper, learning of More's quarrel with the king, says that his religious views have altered considerably and declares that by attacking the Church, the king has become "the Devil's minister." More is admonishing Roper to be more guarded when Rich arrives, pleading again for a position at Court. When More again refuses, Rich denounces More's steward as a spy for Thomas Cromwell. An unmoved More responds, "Of course, that's one of my servants."

Humiliated, Rich joins Cromwell in attempting to bring More down. Meanwhile, the king orders Parliament and the bishops to declare him "Supreme Head of the Church of England". Embracing Caesaropapism, the bishops and Parliament accede to the king's demands and renounce all allegiance to the Pope. More quietly resigns as Lord Chancellor rather than accept the new order. His close friend, Thomas Howard, 3rd Duke of Norfolk, attempts to draw out his opinions in a friendly private chat, but More knows that the time for speaking openly of such matters is over.

In a meeting with Norfolk, Cromwell implies that More's troubles will be over if he will attend the king's "wedding" to Boleyn. After More does not, he is summoned again to the royal palace of Hampton Court, where Cromwell interrogates More inside Wolsey's former office. More refuses to answer and an infuriated Cromwell reveals that the king views More as a traitor, but allows him to leave. The Thames boatmen are aware of the King's hostility to More and refuse to ferry him, so More returns home on foot.

As More finally arrives, his daughter Meg informs him that a new oath is being circulated and that all must take it or face charges of high treason. Initially, More says he might be willing to take the oath, depending on its wording. Upon learning that it names the king as Supreme Head of the Church and allows no legal or moral loopholes, More refuses to take it and is imprisoned in the Tower of London.

More remains steadfast in his refusal to take the Oath and refuses to explain, knowing that he cannot be convicted if he has not explicitly denied the king's supremacy. A request for new books to read backfires, resulting in the confiscation of the books he has, and Rich removes them from More's cell, providing an opportunity for Rich to further debate More.

More says goodbye to his wife Alice, Meg and Roper, urging them not to try to defend him, but to leave the country.

Soon after, More is brought to trial, with Cromwell appearing as counsel for the prosecution. More refuses to express an opinion about the king's second marriage or why he will not take the Oath. As an experienced lawyer and judge, he cites his silence as part of his defence, based upon the legal principle that silence is to be interpreted as consent. Cromwell calls Rich to testify. Rich alleges that, when he went to confiscate More's books, More told him that while Parliament has the power to dethrone the king, it does not have the authority to make the king the Head of the Church.

A horrified More offers to take any oath required by the court that he never said any such thing to Rich. More adds that he would never be so suicidal as to entrust so dangerous an opinion "to such a man as that." As Rich leaves the witness box, it emerges that Rich has been made Attorney General for Wales as a reward from Cromwell for committing perjury, much to More's chagrin.

Under a direct order from Cromwell, the jury convicts More without leaving the courtroom to deliberate. But as the judges begin to pronounce the death penalty, More interrupts and reminds them that prisoners are to be asked before sentencing if they have anything to say.

Upon being so asked by the judges, More declares, "I do." More calls Parliament's Act of Supremacy repugnant to every legal precedent and institution in all the history of Christendom. He cites the Biblical foundation for the Petrine Primacy and the authority of the Papacy, rather than national governments, over the Church. More further declares that the Church's freedom from state control and interference is guaranteed both in Magna Carta and in the king's coronation oath. As uproar ensues, the judges pronounce sentence according to the standard form: More is to be remitted to the Tower to await execution by beheading.

The scene switches from the court to Tower Hill, where More observes custom by pardoning and tipping the executioner. More declares, "I die his Majesty's good servant, but God's first." He kneels at the block and, off-screen, the executioner cuts off More's head.

A narrator intones an epilogue, listing the subsequent untimely deaths of the major characters, apart from Rich, who "became Chancellor of England, and died in his bed."

Cast

 Paul Scofield as Sir Thomas More
 Wendy Hiller as Alice More
 Leo McKern as Thomas Cromwell
 Orson Welles as Cardinal Wolsey
 Robert Shaw as King Henry VIII
 Susannah York as Margaret More
 Nigel Davenport as the Duke of Norfolk
 John Hurt as Richard Rich
 Corin Redgrave as William Roper
 Colin Blakely as Matthew
 Cyril Luckham as Archbishop Thomas Cranmer
 Vanessa Redgrave as Anne Boleyn
 Jack Gwillim as Chief Justice
 Michael Latimer as Norfolk's Aide
 Thomas Heathcote as Boatman
 Yootha Joyce as Averil Machin
 Anthony Nicholls as King's Representative
 John Nettleton as Jailer
 Eira Heath as Matthew's Wife
 Molly Urquhart as Maid
 Paul Hardwick as Courtier
 Philip Brack as Captain of the Guard
 Martin Boddey as Governor of Tower
 Eric Mason as Executioner
 Matt Zimmerman as Messenger

Adaptation

Robert Bolt adapted the screenplay himself. The running commentary of The Common Man was deleted and the character was divided into the roles of the Thames boatman, More's steward, an innkeeper, the jailer from the Tower, the jury foreman and the executioner. The subplot involving the imperial ambassador Eustace Chapuys was also excised. A few minor scenes were added, including Wolsey's death, More's investiture as Chancellor, and Henry's wedding to Anne Boleyn, to cover narrative gaps left by the exclusion of the Common Man.

The Brechtian staging of the final courtroom scene (which depicted the Jury as consisting of the Common Man and several sticks bearing the hats of the various characters he has played) is changed to a more naturalistic setting. Also, while the Duke of Norfolk was the judge both historically and in the play's depiction of the trial, the character of the Chief Justice (Jack Gwillim) was created for the film. Norfolk is still present, but plays little role in the proceedings.

Production

The producers initially feared that Scofield was not a big enough name to draw in audiences, so the producers approached Richard Burton, who turned down the part. Laurence Olivier was also considered, but Zinnemann demanded that Scofield be cast. He played More both in London's West End and on Broadway; the latter appearance led to a Tony Award.

Alec Guinness was the studio's first choice to play Wolsey, and Peter O'Toole its first choice for Henry. Richard Harris was also considered. Bolt wanted film director John Huston to play Norfolk, but he refused. Vanessa Redgrave was originally to have played Margaret, but she had a theatre commitment. She agreed to a cameo as Anne Boleyn on the condition that she not be billed in the part or mentioned in the previews.

To keep the budget at under $2 million, the actors all took salary cuts. Only Scofield, York, and Welles were paid more than £10,000. For playing Rich, his first major film role, John Hurt was paid £3,000. Vanessa Redgrave appeared simply for the fun of it and refused payment.

Leo McKern had played the Common Man in the original West End production of the show, but had been shifted to Cromwell for the Broadway production. He and Scofield are the only members of the cast to appear in both the stage and screen versions of the story. Vanessa Redgrave played Lady Alice in a 1988 remake.

The film is shot in Technicolor.

Reception

Box office
The film was a box office success, making $28,350,000 in the US alone, making it the fifth highest-grossing film of 1966.

Critical reception
A Man for All Seasons received positive reviews from film critics, with an 89% "Fresh" rating on review aggregator Rotten Tomatoes and an average rating of 7.70/10, based on 80 reviews. The critics' consensus states: "Solid cinematography and enjoyable performances from Paul Scofield and Robert Shaw add a spark to this deliberately paced adaptation of the Robert Bolt play." A. D. Murphy of Variety wrote: "Producer-director Fred Zinnemann has blended all filmmaking elements into an excellent, handsome and stirring film version of A Man for All Seasons."

Scofield's performance was particularly praised. Kate Cameron of the New York Daily News wrote, "over all these fine performances, including Robert Shaw's opulent, bluff and forceful representation of the king, it is Scofield who dominates the screen with his genteel voice and steadfast refusal to kowtow to the king, even at the expense of his head." Pauline Kael gave the film a more critical review, writing, "There's more than a little of the school pageant in the rhythm of the movie: Though it's neater than our school drama coaches could make it, the figures group and say their assigned lines and move on."

In 1995, on the occasion of the 100th anniversary of cinema, the Vatican listed it among the greatest movies of all time. In 1999, British Film Institute named A Man for All Seasons the 43rd greatest British film of all time. In 2008, it came 106th on Empire magazine's 500 Greatest Movies of All Time list.

Accolades

See also
 A Man for All Seasons – television film (1988)
 Anne Boleyn in popular culture
 Caesaropapism
 Cultural depictions of Henry VIII of England
 Trial movies
 BFI Top 100 British films

Notes

References

External links

 
 
 
 
 

1966 films
1960s biographical drama films
1960s legal films
1960s historical drama films
Films set in the 1520s
Films set in the 1530s
Best British Film BAFTA Award winners
Best Drama Picture Golden Globe winners
Best Film BAFTA Award winners
Best Picture Academy Award winners
British biographical drama films
British historical drama films
British legal films
Columbia Pictures films
British courtroom films
Films scored by Georges Delerue
Films about capital punishment
Films about Christianity
Films about Henry VIII
Films about lawyers
Films about Catholicism
British films based on plays
Films directed by Fred Zinnemann
Films featuring a Best Actor Academy Award-winning performance
Films featuring a Best Drama Actor Golden Globe winning performance
Films set in country houses
Films set in Tudor England
Films that won the Best Costume Design Academy Award
Films whose cinematographer won the Best Cinematography Academy Award
Films whose director won the Best Directing Academy Award
Films whose director won the Best Director Golden Globe
Films whose writer won the Best Adapted Screenplay Academy Award
Films with screenplays by Robert Bolt
1966 drama films
Cultural depictions of Anne Boleyn
Cultural depictions of Thomas More
1960s English-language films
1960s British films